Kitutu Masaba is an electoral constituency in Kenya. It is one of four constituencies of Nyamira County. The constituency was established for the 1988 elections.

Members of Parliament

Wards 
Prior to 2013, Kitutu Masaba Constituency had eleven wards: Manga, Kemera, Magombo, Gachuba, Rigoma, Gesima, Mochenwa, Getare, Bocharia, Nyankoba and Nyasore. However, electoral ward boundaries were revised to: Gachuba, Gesima, Kemera, Magombo, Manga and Rigoma.

Manga and Masaba North sub-counties
Kitutu Masaba Constituency has two sub-counties, Manga and Masaba North, within its boundaries. Each Sub-county takes three wards each; Kemera, Magombo and Manga wards in Manga Sub-county; Gachuba, Gesima and Rigoma in Masaba North Sub-county. Each sub-county is headed by the sub-county administrator, appointed by a County Public Service Board.

References 

Constituencies in Nyamira County
Constituencies in Nyanza Province
1988 establishments in Kenya
Constituencies established in 1988